Football Club de Chamalières commonly known as  FC Chamalières is a French football club based in Chamalières in the Auvergne-Rhône-Alpes region of France. The club was founded in 1965 and since 2007 plays its games at Complexe Sportif Claude Wolff in the commune.

The club has climbed steadily through the amateur division, winning back-to-back promotions in 2015 and 2016 to reach the Championnat National 3 for the first time. The club plays in Championnat National 2, the fourth level of French football, having secured promotion from the Championnat National 3 in 2019.

In the 2019–20 season, the club only retained their place in National 2 by winning the last game before the season was prematurely terminated due to the COVID-19 pandemic.

Honours
 Division d'Honneur, Auvergne: 2016
 Championnat National 3, Auvergne-Rhône-Alpes: 2019

References

External links
  

Association football clubs established in 1965
1965 establishments in France
Sport in Puy-de-Dôme
Football clubs in Auvergne-Rhône-Alpes